Fanny Birgitta Josefin Sjöberg (born 5 November 1997) is a Swedish curler from Stockholm. She played lead on Team Isabella Wranå from 2007 to 2021, at which point she decided to step back from competitive curling.

Career
Sjöberg played in the World Junior Curling Championships in 2014, 2015, 2017 and 2018 as a member of Team Isabella Wranå. In 2014, her team of Isabella Wranå, Jennie Wåhlin, Elin Lövstrand and Almida de Val had a fourth-place finish, after they lost in the bronze medal game to Russia. In 2015, she and teammates Wranå, Wåhlin, Johanna Heldin and Johanna Höglund again finished fourth after this time losing to Switzerland in the bronze medal game. She was back at the event in 2017 where her team won the gold medal, defeating Scotland's Sophie Jackson in the final, and lost just two round robin games in the process. The next year the same team went undefeated in the round robin, but ended up losing to Canada's Kaitlyn Jones in the final. This team also represented Sweden at the 2017 Winter Universiade, where they took home the bronze medal. Sjöberg represented Sweden one more time at the juniors in 2019 as alternate for Tova Sundberg. They placed sixth.

As World Junior champions, the Wranå rink qualified for the 2017 Humpty's Champions Cup, Sjöberg's first Grand Slam event. The team did not qualify for the playoffs but did win one game. The team won their first World Curling Tour event at the 2018 AMJ Campbell Shorty Jenkins Classic. A month later, they won the Paf Masters Tour. Over the course of the 2018–19 season, the team played in four slams, failing to qualify in any of the four. They won one game at the 2018 Tour Challenge, one game at the 2018 National, no games at the 2019 Canadian Open and one game at the 2019 Champions Cup. Also during this season, the team won the 2019 Winter Universiade.

Team Wranå had a successful 2019–20 season, winning two tour events (the Royal LePage Women's Fall Classic and the Paf Masters Tour once again) and finishing second at the Women's Masters Basel and the Glynhill Ladies International. They played in two slam events, winning one game at both the 2019 Tour Challenge and the 2019 National.

Due to the COVID-19 pandemic, Team Wranå only played in one tour event during the abbreviated 2020–21 season. The team competed at the 2020 Women's Masters Basel, where they missed the playoffs with a 1–2 record. In December, they played Team Hasselborg in the Sweden National Challenge, where they won by a score of 17–12. The Swedish Women's Curling Championship was cancelled due to the pandemic, so Team Hasselborg was named as the Swedish Team for the 2021 World Women's Curling Championship. After the season, Sjöberg decided to step back from competitive curling.

Personal life
Her older brother Axel Sjöberg is her mixed doubles partner. Her father is Bernt Sjöberg, a wheelchair curler who is 2006 Winter Paralympics bronze medallist.

Grand Slam record

Teams

References

External links

Swedish female curlers
Living people
1997 births
Sportspeople from Stockholm
Universiade medalists in curling
Universiade gold medalists for Sweden
Universiade bronze medalists for Sweden
Competitors at the 2019 Winter Universiade
Competitors at the 2017 Winter Universiade
Swedish curling champions